Revaz Gotsiridze (born 17 January 1981) is a Georgian football manager and a former player. 

Since early January 2022 he has been a manager at Shukura Kobuleti.

Career
Gotsiridze left Georgia for Kryvbas Kryvyi Rih in April 2003. But in end of season he was sent back to WIT Georgia. At WIT Georgia, he became team top-scorer and scored in champions playoffs to win Umaglesi Liga in 2004. At the end of season he left Georgia again, this time to KAMAZ Naberezhnye Chelny of Russian First Division. In January 2007, Gotsiridze returned to Caucasus for Olimpi Rustavi, where he won Umaglesi Liga again.

International career
Gotsiridze played twice for Georgia, including one friendly in Malta International Football Tournament 2006.

Honours
Umaglesi Liga: 2004, 2007

References

External links

Footballers from Georgia (country)
Expatriate footballers from Georgia (country)
Georgia (country) international footballers
FC Dinamo Tbilisi players
FC Kryvbas Kryvyi Rih players
FC KAMAZ Naberezhnye Chelny players
Hapoel Petah Tikva F.C. players
Ahva Arraba F.C. players
Ukrainian Premier League players
Expatriate footballers in Ukraine
Expatriate sportspeople from Georgia (country) in Ukraine
Expatriate footballers in Russia
Expatriate footballers in Israel
Association football forwards
Footballers from Tbilisi
1981 births
Living people
FC Sioni Bolnisi players
FC Torpedo Kutaisi players
Football managers from Georgia (country)